Shakhzodbek Sabirov (born May 29, 1993) is an Uzbekistani judoka. He competed at the 2016 Summer Olympics in the men's 81 kg event, in which he was eliminated by Travis Stevens in the third round.

References

External links
 
 

1993 births
Living people
Uzbekistani male judoka
Judoka at the 2016 Summer Olympics
Olympic judoka of Uzbekistan
Judoka at the 2018 Asian Games
Asian Games competitors for Uzbekistan
21st-century Uzbekistani people